Hamidi is a surname. 

Hamidi may also refer to one of the following places:

 Hamidi, Barnala district, India
 Hamidi, Isfahan, Iran
 Hamidi, Khuzestan, Iran

See also
 Hamidiye (disambiguation)
 Hamidiyah
 Hamidiyeh